Chauncey Simpson (December 21, 1901 – April 20, 1970) was the interim head football coach at Missouri from 1943 to 1945 while Don Faurot, the standing head coach, served in the Navy during World War II. He compiled a 12–14–2 record including a 40–27 loss to Texas in the 1946 Cotton Bowl Classic. During that time, he also served as the school's track coach. He himself, was a football player at Missouri. With Faurot's return in 1946 Simpson reverted to his pre-war position as an assistant football coach. He was also the institution's long-time golf coach before retiring in the 1960s.

He was the younger brother of hurdler and track coach Robert Simpson.

Head coaching record

References

External links
 

1901 births
1970 deaths
Basketball coaches from Missouri
Missouri Tigers football coaches
Missouri Tigers football players
Truman Bulldogs football coaches
Truman Bulldogs men's basketball coaches
College golf coaches in the United States
College men's track and field athletes in the United States
College track and field coaches in the United States
People from Carroll County, Missouri
People from Green Valley, Arizona